Club Alianza Atlético de Sullana is a Peruvian football club, located in the city of Sullana, Piura. The club was founded in 1920 and promoted to the Peruvian Primera División in 1988. They are the only Peruvian top-tier club not based in a state capital.

History
The club was founded January 18, 1920. It been present for the first time in an end of Peru Cup in 1984 where obtained the subchampionship under Los Espartanos of Pacasmayo. Its income to the Professional Championship obtained it via the Intermediate Phase of 1987. The club has played in the Primera División Peruana since 1988. Alianza has never been national champions since they were promoted. In 1989 it was near to classify to the Copa Libertadores of America, falling 2–0 before Sporting Cristal in an extra match that defined the Regional Tournament.

The club has 3 appearances in three international cups. The first one was in the Copa Sudamericana 2004, in the first round they defeated Coronel Bolognesi but in the second round they were eliminated by Atlético Junior. Their second time that they played in an international cup was in the Copa Sudamericana 2005. In the first round they defeated Universitario and then they were eliminated by Universidad Católica. Their third time that they played in an international cup was in the Copa Sudamericana 2009. In the first round they defeated Deportivo Anzoátegui and then they were eliminated by Fluminense.

In 2011 they were relegated after 23 years.

In 2015, they gained promotion to the Primera División Peruana because of a FIFA Resolution.

Stadium

The venue name, Champions of 1936, is misleading. No Peruvian League was actually played in 1936 as the national team was preparing itself to compete in the 1936 Summer Olympics in Germany. Two main theories as of the origin of the name exist. The first is that Alianza Atlético won a special national tournament (representing their home state, Piura) governed by the Peruvian Football Federation, and the name stuck despite not being recognized officially as national champions thereafter. The second is that it was name as such for the heroic campaign of the Peru national football team at the 1936 Olympic football tournament over the controversial Peru vs. Austria quarterfinals match.

Estadio Campeones del 36 is currently undergoing renovations. Estadio Melanio Coloma which is found at the opposite end of the city of Sullana is the club's current stadium for matches during the 2017 season.

Honours

National
Torneo Clausura:
Runner-up (1): 2003

Torneo Regional:
Runner-up (1): 1989-I

Liga 2:
Winners (1): 2020
Runner-up (1): 2019

Copa Perú:
Runner-up (1): 1984

Regional
Liga Departamental de Piura:
Winners (4): 1966, 1968, 1983, 1986
Runner-up (4): 1967, 1969, 1970, 1971

Liga Distrital de Sullana:
Winners (35): 1928, 1929, 1930, 1933, 1934, 1935, 1943, 1944, 1945, 1946, 1947, 1948, 1949, 1951, 1952, 1953, 1957, 1958, 1959, 1960, 1966, 1967, 1968, 1969, 1970, 1971, 1972, 1973, 1975, 1976, 1977, 1981, 1982, 1983, 1986.

Performance in CONMEBOL competitions
Copa Sudamericana: 3 appearances
2004: Preliminary Round
2005: First Round
2009: Round of 16

Alianza Atlético in South America

Current squad
.

Notable players

Managers
 Freddy Ternero (1995)
 Rafael Castillo (2000–01)

See also
List of football clubs in Peru
Peruvian football league system

References

External links
Club website

 
Football clubs in Peru
Association football clubs established in 1920